Proneptunea is a genus of sea snails, marine gastropod mollusks in the family Buccinidae, the true whelks.

Species
Species within the genus Proneptunea include:

 Proneptunea rossiana Dell, 1990
 Proneptunea rufa Oliver & Picken, 1984
 Proneptunea subfenestra Oliver & Picken, 1984

References

External links

Buccinidae